Optik Records was a German hip hop label located in Berlin. The label was shut down in 2009 due to financial problems.

History 
Founded in 2002 by Kool Savas, early records included "Optik Crew: Optik Mixtape Vol.1" by various label artists and "Der beste Tag meines Lebens" by Kool Savas. The Optik Youngstarz were founded in 2005 which included founder Savas' cousin. Also in 2005, Kool Savas released "Die John Bello Story". The 2006 Kool Savas/Optik Records compilation Optik Takeover was a hit in central Europe, reaching #8 on the German album charts, #39 in Switzerland, and #40 in Austria. The last album released unter the subcontract with Sony BMG/Subword was "Tot oder Lebendig" by Kool Savas in 2007.

In July 2008, Savas announced that Optik Records would cease operations due to financial difficulties after the tour in January 2009. The label shut down in February 2009.

Artists

Optik Records

Optik Schweiz

Optik Russia 
 I.G.O.R.
Oxxxymiron

Discography

Albums

Singles

EPs 
 2003 Kool Savas feat. Valezka: Der Beste Tag Meines Lebens (EP)
 2003 SD: Wie Es Geht / Oh
 2004 Caput: Sieben
 2004 SD: Dirrrty
 2004 Ercandize: Willkommen im Dschungel

Mixtapes 
{| border="0" width="100%"
 | valign="top" width="50%"|
 2002 Optik Crew: Optik Mixtape Vol.1
 2003 DJ Nicon: Optische Elemente
 2003 DJ Nicon: Optische Elemente Pt.2
 2004 Kool Savas: Kool Savas goes Hollywood
 2004 Ercandize & DJ Katch: Ear 2 The Street
 2004 Ercandize: Best Of Ercandize
 2004 Kutmasta Kurt: Redneck Olympics 2005 Caput: Die Caputte Sicht 2005 Kool Savas & Optik Records Präsentieren: Die John Bello Story 2005 DJ Nicon: Optische Elemente 2.5 2005 DJ Nicon & DJ Fiks: Crunkshit | valign="top" width="50%"|
 2006 Ercandize & DJ Katch: Ear 2 The Street Vol.2 2006 Ercandize: La Haine / Sie nannten ihn Mücke 2006 Franky Kubrick: Mein Moneyfest 2007 Amar: Cho! Hier habt ihr euer Mixtape 2007 Kool Savas & Optik Records präsentieren: No Money? No Problem! 2008 Franky Kubrick: Chronisch Frank (online mixtape)
 2008 Franky Kubrick: Chronisch Frank 2 (online mixtape)
|}

 DVDs 
 2003 Kool Savas: Der Beste Tag Meines Lebens 2005 Kool Savas & Azad: One 2006 Kool Savas: Feuer über Deutschland 2008 Kool Savas:  Tot oder Lebendig LIVE ''

References

Companies based in Berlin
Defunct record labels of Germany
Record labels established in 2002
Record labels disestablished in 2009
2002 establishments in Germany